Jilla is the feature film soundtrack of the 2014 Tamil film of the same name directed by T. Nesan starring Mohanlal, Vijay and Kajal Aggarwal. The film's soundtrack and Background score were composed by D. Imman which marks his first collaboration with Mohanlal and Nesan and his second collaboration with Vijay after the 2002 Tamil film Thamizhan. The soundtrack consists of 6 Tracks and 2 Karaoke Tracks whose lyrics were written by Yugabharathi, Vairamuthu and Viveka. Vijay along with Shreya Ghoshal crooned for the song Kandangi Kandangi. The audio rights of the film were purchased by Star Music. The Album was released on 21 December 2013 and received positive response from critics as well as audience.

Production
D. Imman was signed as the music director which marks his first collaboration with Mohanlal and Nesan and his second collaboration with Vijay after the 2002 Tamil film Thamizhan. The lyrics were written by Yugabharathi, Vairamuthu and Viveka. Vijay along with Shreya Ghoshal crooned for the song Kandangi Kandangi. Introduction song of the film was sung by S. P. Balasubrahmanyam and Shankar Mahadevan. The official track list was released on 16 December 2013 along with the one of Ajith's Veeram. On 18 December 2013 Imman unveiled the promo songs of the film  and the full album was released on 21 December 2013.

Track list

Reception
'Behindwoods' rated 3.25/5, stating "Imman’s class meets Vijay's mass". 'Top10 Cinema' said "On the whole, Jilla songs are good and they’re sure to top the charts within a short span of time. D Imman has very well used the opportunity and has done a fabulous job. Massive treat for Ilayathalapathy fans". 'Thelyricsworld.com' praised the album rating it 3.2/5, and went on to add that Jilla is among the best album in D. Imman's career.  Cinemalead.com rated 3.5/5 and commented "Sure shot winner". 'Indiaglitz' gave 3.9/5 and stated "The nail-biting wait has come to an end, and 'Jilla' has matched up to expectations to the fullest. Imman has composed some of the finest tunes, tailor-made for the youthful josh. But it is not restricted one age-group - the songs are for all, as everyone will enjoy this energy, without exception. With this, the expectations about the film has risen up multiple notches, as we gear up for a smashing Pongal this January". Vijay's "Kandangi" with Shreya Ghoshal topped the charts. Shreya Ghoshal was nominated for Filmfare Award for Best Female Playback Singer-Tamil.

References

Tamil film soundtracks
2013 soundtrack albums
D. Imman soundtracks